Zoustar (foaled 8 September 2010) is a two-time Group 1 winning Australian Thoroughbred racehorse and successful sire who has sired multiple stakes winners.

Background

Originally bred by Racetree Stud outside of Beaudesert, Queensland, Zoustar was sold for A$85,000 at the 2011 National Weanling Sale.  He was sold again at the 2012 Magic Millions yearling sale for A$140,000 to syndicator Sheriff Iskander.

Racing career

Zoustar was successful in his first start on the 13 April 2013 winning at Canterbury by almost two-lengths.  He won his next two starts culminating in his first stakes race when taking out the Sires' Produce Stakes at Doomben.

As a three-year-old Zoustar won his first Group 1, the Golden Rose Stakes at Rosehill.  Trainer Chris Waller said after the race, "He's a serious colt, a valuable colt now … geez he's got a big future."

Three weeks later Zoustar effortlessly won the Roman Consul Stakes at Randwick by a margin of over four-lengths.

This victory ensured that Zoustar would start the even money favourite in the Coolmore Stud Stakes at Flemington a month later on the 2 November 2013.  Zoustar won the race comfortably by a margin of two-lengths and allowed jockey Jim Cassidy to ride his 100th Group 1 winner of his career.

After a four month break, Zoustar finished 8th in the Canterbury Stakes and was retired to perform stud duties.

Stud career

Zoustar was purchased for A$18 million by Widden Stud which Is located in the Hunter Valley of New South Wales.

Zoustar's service fee for his first four seasons was set at A$44,000.  By 2021 this had risen to A$154,000 and in 2022 it stands at A$198,000.

Zoustar shuttles each year to Tweenhills Stud in the Northern Hemisphere.

Notable progeny

c = colt, f = filly, g = gelding

Pedigree

References 

Racehorses bred in Australia
Racehorses trained in Australia
2010 racehorse births